The Zecchino d'Oro International Festival of Children's Song has been held every year since 1959, first as a national (Italian) event, and after 1976 as an international one. The 1964 songs were recorded for an LP titled The Little Dancing Chicken, (an English translation of "Il Pulcino Ballerino", the award-winning song that year). The LP was released in the United States.

Colours:  /

1959 (1 ZdO) - 1970 (12 ZdO)

1 Zecchino d'Oro (1959)
Beniamino
Capelli turchini
Girotondo dei fumetti
Girotondo rataplan
I colombini
La bella topolina

Lettera di natale
Magia


2 Zecchino d'Oro (1960)
A, E, I, O, U, Cha-Cha-Cha
Al castel di Barbablù
Caro Gesù Bambino

Girotondo dei nonni
Il ruscelletto
Il teatrino
L'orologio del nonno
Pilù
Pupazzetti
Tramonto sull'alpe
Vorrei volare

3 Zecchino d'Oro (1961)
C'era una volta
Cestini e grembiulini
Girotondo col mio mondo
Il nome più bello
La barchetta di carta
La canzone dei poeti
L'altalena

Pesciolino rosso
Piccolo indiano
Trenta quaranta
Una stellina legata col filo

4 Zecchino d'Oro (1962)
Bimbi in pigiama
Chiccolino di caffè
Fammi crescere i denti davanti
Getto la palla
Il cavallino del west

La stella di latta
L'aquilone
Lunapark
Mille orsacchiotti
Un corsaro piccolissimo
Vola... non vola

5 Zecchino d'Oro (1963)
Carnevale allo zoo
Dormi, dormi orsetto blu
I tre corsari
Il pescatore di stelle
In punta di piedi
La giostra del carillon
La zanzara
Le mie tasche

Papà ritorna bambino
Penna nera
Stellina di mare

6 Zecchino d'Oro (1964)
Concertino in cucina
Da grande voglio fare
I numeri
Il presepe di stagnola

Il tiro all'orso
Il torrone
La favola della gatta Miagola
La mia nave fantastica
La piuma rossa
Me l'ha detto un uccellino
Se avessi

7 Zecchino d'Oro (1965)
Caccia al tesoro
C'era un leone
Che pasticcio la grammatica

I miei soldatini
Il calendario di un bambino
La gondola nel secchio
La tromba del pagliaccio
Se fossi un marziano
Serafino l'uomo sul filo
Tom Tirilin Tom
Tre civette sul comò

8 Zecchino d'Oro (1966)
Extramusicale-giromagitondo
Girotondo di tutto il mondo

Il dito in bocca
Il dodicesimo
Il pinguino Belisario
L’ochetta Gelsomina
La bella-la-figlia del Re
Orazio il cane dello spazio
Quando è l’ora di fare la nanna
Se osassi
Sgniff e Sgnaff

9 Zecchino d'Oro (1967)
E ciunfete... nel pozzo
Il cane capellone
Il leprotto pim-pum-pam
La canzone della luna
La lucciola nel taschino
La mini-coda
La pecorella al bosco
Para papà
Per un ditino nel telefono

Tre goccioline
Un milione di anni fa

10 Zecchino d'Oro (1968)
Abracadabra
Coriolano, l'allegro caimano
Il semaforo
Il topo Zorro
Il torero Camomillo
Il valzer del moscerino
La banda dello zoo

Se fossi Leonardo
Sitting Bull
Tinta e ghiri
Tre guerrieri indiani

11 Zecchino d'Oro (1969)
Ciao, Napoleone
Cin-Ciu-E
Il pesciolino stanco
La luna è matta
La nuvola bianca e la nuvola nera
Le guardie hanno i baffi
L'omino della luna
Nicchi sgnacchi mucchi mucchi
Re trombone
Sarà vero?...

Volevo un gatto nero

12 Zecchino d'Oro (1970)
Carlo Magno
Che bella festa sarà
Il lungo, il corto e il pacioccone
Il soldato millepiedi
La ballata degli elefanti
La moto da moto-cross

Manue-e-lo
Ninna nanna del chicco di caffè
Per un bicchier di vino
Tommytom
Un pupazzo di neve

1971 (13 ZdO) - 1980 (23 ZdO)

13 Zecchino d'Oro (1971)
Annibale, cannibale terribile
Baby cow-boy
Baciccia il pirata
È fuggito l'agnellino

Il gamberetto Pietro
Il karaté
Il sorpassista
La corriera del far west
La ninna nanna degli animaletti
Partiam, sì, sì, partiam!
Quattro chiacchiere in famiglia

14 Zecchino d'Oro (1972)
Ali Babà
Cik e ciak
Cin cin pon pon
Gli stivali ballerini
Il generale Giovanni
Il sottomarino raffreddato
La banda del formaggio
La gallina coccouà
La mini astronave
La torre degli asinelli
Sette cani brontoloni


15 Zecchino d'Oro (1973)
Filastrocca din din din
Hanno rubato il prato
Il festival pop
Il guercio, il lungo, il nano
Io con chi sto?
Issa-gira-butta-tira
La ballata dell'orso brutto

La tartaruga sprint
Pancho, l'eroe del texas
Pepito de la pampa
Sono l'ottavo di sette fratelli

16 Zecchino d'Oro (1974)
Ciribiricoccola

Concerto della città
Il buio
Il gioco della rima
Il mago matto
La cometa ha perso la coda
L'orso Giovanni
Nonna-ni-nonnina
Tutto questo per un chiodo
Umpa-pà
Un gigante

17 Zecchino d'Oro (1975)
Civa civetta
Il barone sbadiglione
Il vigile in gonnella
La banda del cortile

La mongolfiera con il golf
La slitta vagabonda
La vera storia del salice piangente
L'albero della cuccagna
L'angioletto in blue jeans
Ma dov'è quel porcellino?
Riaccattattà

18 Zecchino d'Oro (1976)
Big Jim
Guglielmo il castoro
Il musichito
Il pirata gambamossia

Mamma tutto
Padre nostro che sei dappertutto
Quattrocentocinquanta bottoni
Se manca pane e vino cosa fai?
Sette note per una favoletta
Show nella foresta
Teru terubozu
Ticche ticche tacche
Vento venticello

19 Zecchino d'Oro (1976, 2nd edition)
Enchete penchete puff tinè

Il corsaro nero nero
Il fiore di città
Le api del convento
Libertà è un paio d'ali
Ma che cosa ci posso fare?
Non perder la pazienza, mamma
Non pianger, piccino mio

Riccardo cuor di leopardo
Sono una talpa e vivo in un buco
Torero al pomodoro

20 Zecchino d'Oro (1977)
Biribiribindi Biribiribanda
Cavallino peruviano
Dai, dai balla il syrtaki
Finché non cado dal sonno
Hagi firuz
I castelli di Brisighella

La buona volontà
Nel duemila
Rapa - rapanello
Rumbakatumba
Samba della mia terra

21 Zecchino d'Oro (1978)
Alibombo
Calcio calcio

E l'arca navigava
Grazie
Il naso ficcanaso
Il più dei canguri
La più bella nonna ce l'ho io
Maggio
Nella bottega di mastro André
Per un capello in più
Uffa gli ufo

22 Zecchino d'Oro (1979)
Che roba, quel robot!
Cip ciu cì
Gioco di parole
Hanno rubato il vocabolario
I re magi
La mamma sa, la mamma è... (/)
Mamma Folletta
San Francisco
Terra mia
Ululalì ululalà

Un sole tutto mio

23 Zecchino d'Oro (1980)
Ballata Tirolese
Banjo blu
Col pianoforte in spalla
È tutto uno scherzo
Felice con la mia mamma

Il violino di Angiolino
La mia dolce Nellì
La vera storia di rock e roll
L'amico mio più amico
Ma che febbre dispettosa
Marco Polo

1981 (24 ZdO) - 1990 (33 ZdO)

24 Zecchino d'Oro (1981)

Il fabbro del paese
Itik-Itik
La baby radio
La piramide
Ma che magia!
Magunda
Ninna nanna, malandrino
Per una frittella
Un gallo del Portogallo
Una mela a metà
Zia Nena

25 Zecchino d'Oro (1982)
Bambini attenti, attenti...!
Carnevalito carnevalà
Che bello-llo...!

Il chierichetto
Il Merill Tweet Tweet
Il pianeta Mallakà
Il piccolo pescatore
La felicità
Musicante giramondo
Santa Lu-Lucia
Vanessa, la fattoressa

26 Zecchino d'Oro (1983)
Arirang
Attacca al chiodo quel fucile!
Caterina Caterina
E dopo dormirò
Evviva la domenica!

Il valzer della polenta

Piccolo uomo nero
Sole pioggia
Tango, mago tango
Tinghelinghelin

27 Zecchino d'Oro (1984)
Arcobaleno
Bam-Bù
Che giornata!
Coro, caro coro
Dormi, mio bel piccino
Etciù!
La mazurca della mela Annurca
L'ultima spiaggia
Mi regali una ciambella?
Ninna nanna per non dormire

Quando due bambini

28 Zecchino d'Oro (1985)
BIT
Ho preso un granchio
Il sole e il girasole
Io Tarzan, tu Jane
L’amico albero
La ballata del caballito moro
La mela della vita, la mela dell'amore
Non ci gioco più
Ombretta del Mississipì

Tonino violino
Un due tré - siam trentatré

29 Zecchino d'Oro (1986)
Amico

Cin-ciam-pai
È partita la stazione
Il fazzoletto d'oro

Pubbli pubbli pubblicità

Suor Margherita
Tortuga, pirata sempre in fuga
Tre luci
Vola, palombella!
Zucchero Bill

30 Zecchino d'Oro (1987)
A come Alfabeto
Annibale

Corri troppo, Tobia!
Il gelataio
Il mio grande papà
In Australia c'è...
La gallina ha fatto l'uovo
L'aquilone dei sogni
Le frittelle
Mille voci una voce
Oh mamà, papà

31 Zecchino d'Oro (1988)
Balancê

Canzone blu
Filastrocche e tiritere
Il folletto bianco
La storia del fiume
Ma lui non sa che io lo so
Nettuno netturbino
Noi noi noi
Papà non fumare
Sogno di un giardino di mezza estate
Un maggiolino speciale

32 Zecchino d'Oro (1989)
Amsterdam
Canzone della gioia
Come sta il bebè?

Ho paura, papà!
Ho visto un re
Il bambino che vale un Perù
Il naufrago
Il triangolo Paiù
Io darei non so che
L'allegria
Mettiamoci a ballare

33 Zecchino d'Oro (1990)
Concerto nel prato

Il nostro amico Onam
La canzone dei colori
La conta
L'ocona sgangherona
Mother's day

Pipistrello radar
Tegolino
Uccellino dell'azzurro
Un papero nero

1991 (34 ZdO) - 2000 (43 ZdO)

34 Zecchino d'Oro (1991)
Al luna park
Bambinissimi papà
Bolle di sapone
Fründ, amico, ami
Il corsaro nero è andato in pensione
Il mio dentino dondola
Il più grande motore
La Rosella

Padre Celeste
Pesci, bimbi e draghi
Sette matitine

35 Zecchino d'Oro (1992)
Barabà, Ciccì e Coccò
Bimbi felici
I pupazzetti
La canzone di Kian
La cicala
La mia automobilissima velocissima di cartapecora
Le barche della bontà
Luccioletta, dove sei?
Maddalena la balena
Né bianco né nero
Questo samba


36 Zecchino d'Oro (1993)
Balalaika
Gli angeli di Nôtre Dame
I tre pagliacci
  
Il dialetto dell'amore
La barchetta di carta
La nonna di Beethoven
Mami papi
Mamma che stress
Minnie
Pesciolino rosso
Si gira un film
Tango matto
Vulcani di qui... vulcani di là!

37 Zecchino d'Oro (1994)
Antenne blu
Bianco con il giallo
Cipro
Giochiamo alle cose
Goccia dopo goccia
I folletti d'Islanda
Il cestino dei sogni
La canzone
La terra è una palla
Ma che pizza

Scuola rap
Se voglio
Solidarietà

38 Zecchino d'Oro (1995)
All'arrembaggio del formaggio
Amico cow boy
Amico nemico
Battimani
Che belli gli uccellini
Ho sognato una canzone
Il batterista
Il sogno più bello

La giraffa Genoveffa
Ma chi l'ha detto...
Ok boy!
Samurai
Tanzanía-e

39 Zecchino d'Oro (1996)
Bambolotto di caucciù
Casa mia

Filastrocca dei fumetti
Il colmo
Il computer innamorato
Il mio pappagallo
Il super poliglotta
La mucca e i semi di zucca
La scatola dei tesori
L'astronave di Capitan Rottame
L'ovino alla coque
Ohi Ohi Ohi! (Càpitano tutte a me)
Tenerotto, Grigiolino e Ruvidone

40 Zecchino d'Oro (1997)
Caro Gesù ti scrivo
C'è una canzone che vola
Gira gira con la lira
Gira, gira il mappamondo
Il gran concorso degli animali
Il katalicammello

L'amicizia è...
Panna e cioccolato
Sono un duro, però
Sottosopra

Un mondo nuovo
Vento colorino

41 Zecchino d'Oro (1998)
Batti cinque (4/4 di silenzio)
Coccole!
Il bar di Dario il dromedario
Il mio amico Mosè
Il tappeto volante
Il tesoro del re
La mamma della mamma

Piove con il sole
Preghiera
Quando la tigre non ci sarà più
Signor Metèo
Terra
Un cuoricino in più

42 Zecchino d'Oro (1999)
Basta un sorriso
Gira il girasole
Gira! che è un girotondo
In un mare caldo
Io, col 2000
La canzone dei chicchi di riso

La mia orchestra
La Niña, la Pinta, la Santa Maria
L'albero
Lumacher
Madre bambina
Mitico angioletto
Salta balla batti sveglia

43 Zecchino d'Oro (2000)
Balalaika magica
Bella l’estate
Gedeone marziano pasticcione
I gol di Zé
Il ciuco Cico

Il dialetto
Il rock della K
La coccinella sul go-kart
Le oche del Campidoglio
Non voglio cantare
Spunta la luna
Su e giù
Un leopardo per amico

2001 (44 ZdO) - 2010 (53 ZdO)

44 Zecchino d'Oro (2001)
Bongo direttore di banda
Cina è...
Il gallo ha fatto l'uovo

Il topo con gli occhiali
La gallina Painè
L'amico dei perché
Novembre
Piove, piove
Respiriamo la città
Scacco matto
Un attimo di respiro
Vieni nel mio villaggio
W la neve

45 Zecchino d'Oro (2002)
Canzone indigena
Grande diventerò
I nonni son felici
Il gioco dell'alfabeto
Il ramarro con tre erre
La gallina brasiliana
La pace c'è!
L'ambasciator di Paranà

Marcobaleno
Nonni nonni
Per un amico
Se ci credi anche tu
Violino mio

46 Zecchino d'Oro (2003)
Bruno
Crock, Shock, Brock, Clock
Il cielo di Beirut
Il mio fratellino a distanza (Assulaiè)
Il tempo
Il tip tap del millepiedi
La guerra dei mutandoni

Ma va là
Magico
Olga la tata del Volga
Rockhopper Hop
Ti canterò (per la gioia che mi dai)
Un’amica colombiana

47 Zecchino d'Oro (2004)
Annibale e l’elefante Aristide
Dolce matematica
Emilio

Il mio nonno è un DJ
Il nostro Festival
Il Pianeta Grabov
L’orso canterino
La stellina
Le note son bambine
Patataj
Quell’anello d’oro
Tali e Quali
Una stella a Betlemme

48 Zecchino d'Oro (2005)
Dino l'Imbianchino
Hip Hop Ippopotamo
Il cammello con tre gobbe
Il casalingo
Il drago raffreddato
Il mio amico samurai
Il mio cuore è un gran pallone

In bici in città
Inventa una poesia
Io sono un aquilotto
L'amico mio fantasma
Lo zio Be
Un mondo di gelato
 (not participant)

49 Zecchino d'Oro (2006)
Dottoressa Lulù
È solo un gioco
Il maggiolino cicciaboccia
La canzone più facile del mondo
La formula magica
La mia Suisse
La torta di pere e cioccolato
Lo scriverò nel vento
Ninna la ninna ninna ninna o'
Siamo le note
Ticche Tocche Tà!
Tin tin Berimbau
Un baby presidente


50 Zecchino d'Oro (2007)
Amici per la pelle
Filastrocche
Il bullo citrullo
Il segreto del sorriso
Io gioco
L'aeroplano

Radio Criceto 33
Terra gentile
Un cane in carne e ossa
Un fiore nel deserto
Una bella poesia
Una forchetta di nome Giulietta
Un'altalena in cielo

51 Zecchino d'Oro (2008)
Attenti alla musica
Come un aquilone
Giochi di parole
Ika o do gba
Il mare sa parlare
Il mio mondo
Il Tortellino


Skamaleonte
Ti faccio la foto
Tito e Tato

52 Zecchino d'Oro (2009)
Buonanotte, mezzo mondo
Castelli di sabbia
La danza di Rosinka

La lumaca Elisabetta
La mia età
La mia ombra
Messer Galileo
Pigiama party
Rokko cavallo brocco
Tutti a tavola
Voglio chiamarmi Ugo

53 Zecchino d'Oro (2010)
7
Bravissimissima
Forza Gesù
Grazie a te
I suoni delle cose
Il ballo del girasole

Io pregherò
La scimmia, la volpe e le scarpe
Libus
Un sogno nel cielo


2011 (54 ZdO) - 2020 (63 ZdO)

54 Zecchino d'Oro (2011)
Al ritmo della tabla
Bye bye, ciao ciao
Il gatto mascherato
Il rap del peperoncino
La Paella
La palma dell’acqua
Mosca
Prova a sorridere
Regalerò un sogno
Silenzio
Tartarumba


55 Zecchino d'Oro (2012)
Il blues del manichino
Il canto del gauchito

Il sirtaki di Icaro
La ballata del principe azzurro
La banda sbanda
La tarantella della mozzarella
Le galline intelligenti... ma sgrammaticate!
Lo gnomo Deodato
Lupo Teodoro
Quello che mi aspetto da te
Verso l'aurora

56 Zecchino d'Oro (2013)
Bambù balla
Choco Jodel

Facile facile
Il Verbivoro
La ranocchia pintistrocchia
Mister Doing (il signor canguro)
Ninnaneve
Plik e pluk

Sognando Sognando
Una vita da bradipo

57 Zecchino d'Oro (2014)

Chicopez
Ci vuole un titolo
Do i numeri
I Beagles
Il cuore del re
Il domani
La mia casa
La tarantola
L'orsacchiotto dall'oblò
Mono monopattino
Un sogno leggerissimo

58 Zecchino d'Oro (2015)
Cavoli a merenda
Il contrabbasso
Il gonghista
Il rompigatto
Le impronte del cuore
Le parce que des pourquoi

Resterà con te
Tutanc’mon
Un giorno a colori
Una commedia divina
Zombie vegetariano

59 Zecchino d'Oro (2016)
Cerco un circo

Dove vanno i sogni al mattino
Il dinosauro di plastica
Kyro
L’orangotango bianco
La vera storia di Noè
Per un però
Pikku peikko

Raro come un diamante
Saro

60 Zecchino d'Oro (2017)
 Bumba e la zumba
 Canzone scanzonata
 Gualtiero dei mestieri
 Il pescecane (solo un ciao)
 L’anisello Nunù
 La ballata dei calzini spaiati
 Lo senti anche tu
 Mediterraneamente
 Ninna nanna di sua maestà
 Radio giungla
 Sì, davvero mi piace!
 

61 Zecchino d'Oro (2018)
 Chi lo dice che
 Daria
 La banda della pastasciutta
 La cicala latina
 La marmellata innamorata
 
 Me la faccio sotto
 Meraviglioso è
 Metti avanti il cuore
 Napoleone va in pensione
 Nero nero
 Toro Loco

62 Zecchino d'Oro (2019)
 
 I pesci parlano
 Il bombo
 L’inno del girino
 La memoria
 Mettici la salsa!
 Non capisci un tubo
 O tucano goleador
 Skodinzolo
 Sono felice
 Tosse
 Un principe blu

63 Zecchino d'Oro (2020)
CD sale and music streaming available since 4 December 2020
TV broadcast delayed to 30 May 2021 due to COVID-19 pandemic.
 Cha cha cha del gatto nella scatola
 Come le formiche
 
 Discopizza dj
 Hai visto mai
 Il bambino e il mare
 Il serpente balbuziente
 La vacanza ideale
 Mille scarpe
 Mozart è stato gestito male
 Pappappero
 Pippo e la motoretta
 Salutare è salutare
 Un minuto

2021 (64 ZdO) - 2030 (73 ZdO)

64 Zecchino d'Oro (2021)
 Ali di carta
 Auto rosa
 Bartolo il barattolo
 Ci sarà un po' di voi
 Clap clap
 Il ballo del ciuaua
 Il reggaetonno
 Il riccio capriccio
 La filastrocca delle vocali
 NG New Generation
 Potevo nascere gattino
 Ri-cer-ca-to
 
 Una pancia

65 Zecchino d'Oro (2022)
 Ci vuole pazienza
 Come King Kong
 Gioca con me papà
 Giovanissimo papà
 Il maglione
 Il mondo alla rovescia
 
 L’acciuga raffreddata
 L’orso col ghiacciolo
 La canzone della settimana
 Mambo rimambo
 Mettiamo su la band
 Mille fragole
 Zanzara

References 

Italian music-related lists
Oro